Madeleine Arbour  (born March 3, 1923) is a Canadian designer, painter, and journalist living in Quebec. She was the first woman to preside over the Conseil des arts in Montreal. Arbour is recognized as a pioneer in interior design, communication and visual arts.

Career
Born in Granby, Quebec on March 3, 1923, Arbour has worked in Quebecois television as a journalist and as a set designer. During the 1940s, she was associated with Les Automatistes and signed the Refus Global manifesto in 1948. In addition, she has taught at the Institute of Applied Arts in Montreal and the College du Vieux-Montreal.

In 1965, she established an interior design company. Among her major works are the design of Via Rail coaches, Air Canada aircraft, the interior of the former studio of painter Jean-Paul Riopelle, a room at the Citadelle of Quebec and public spaces at the residence of the Governor General of Canada. In 1974, she animated the title card to Patofville for CFTM-TV.

Arbour has received significant recognition for her contributions to the Canadian visual arts and design scene: in 1986, she was named to the Order of Canada. In 1998, she was further awarded the Prix Condorcet. She was named a Chevaliere in the National Order of Quebec in 1999. In 2001, she was named to the Royal Canadian Academy of Arts.

In 1984, Arbour was recognized by the Conseil national du design for her contributions to the development of Canadian design. She was also the subject of an exhibition at the Musée national des beaux-arts du Québec: "Madeleine Arbour: espace de bonheur".

References

External links 
 

1923 births
Living people
Artists from Quebec
Canadian women painters
Canadian interior designers
Canadian scenic designers
Knights of the National Order of Quebec
Members of the Order of Canada
Members of the Royal Canadian Academy of Arts
People from Granby, Quebec
Women scenic designers
20th-century Canadian painters
20th-century Canadian women artists
21st-century Canadian painters
21st-century Canadian women artists
Canadian theatre designers